Dalziel High School is a non-denominational secondary school in Motherwell, North Lanarkshire, Scotland. The head teacher is Jaclyn Martin.

Overview
James K. Scobbie, Rector from 1957 until 1974, greatly enhanced the school's performance during his tenure. Since then, the school has received some of the best reports of any school in Scotland. The school was one of the first in the country to be awarded Charter Mark status (now Customer Service Excellence), as well as being awarded the National Award For Excellence for Work and Enterprise. On 11 November 2008, the secondary school was voted as the best in Scotland in a report by HMIe. Dalziel was also successful in winning the Customer Service Excellence award with no partial compliances and the highest standard of compliance plus, one of only a few schools in the United Kingdom to win this award.

The school motto is Summa Petenda (Aim for the highest).

The school has a specialised hearing impaired department, which caters to severely hearing impaired pupils from Lanarkshire and beyond.

Houses
The three school houses are Barclay, Colville, and Greig. Originally there were four houses: Avon, Brandon, Clyde and Douglas.

Feeder schools 
The school's feeder schools include Glencairn Primary School, Knowetop Primary School and Ladywell Primary School. Pupils from other schools near to Dalziel, such as Logans Primary School, are usually transferred to Braidhurst High School.

Sports 
Dalziel High School has its own playing fields, located at Dalziel Park, between the villages of Cleland and Carfin. The fields were proposed by the school's War Memorial Trust, and was to act as a permanent tribute to all the former pupils who died in the First World War and the Second World War. The playing fields were established through the purchase of the  Cleland Estate from the Colville family after the wars. Cleland Estate was also the venue for the annual Drama Festival. The estate was later redesigned to make it more compact and improve the quality of the pitches and this change was formalised when it was opened by the Princess Royal on 5 April 2001.

A handful of sports teams use these fields, some of which include the rugby club Dalziel (a club which was, for a number years, only for former pupils of the school), and the local SPL football team Motherwell, as well as a number of local athletics, tennis and hockey clubs. The Dalziel Park playing fields are regarded as one of the best in the country.

In February 2012, Dalziel was unveiled as a community sports hub.

Notable alumni 

 Iain Bonomy, Lord Bonomy (born 1946), Senator of the College of Justice 1997–2012, Judge of the International Criminal Tribunal for the former Yugoslavia 2004–09
Allan Gentleman (born 1953), Scotland Swimming Team, World Masters Swimming Champion 
 Sir Alexander Gibson (1926–1995), conductor
 Liz Lochhead (born 1947), poet, playwright and broadcaster
 Sandy McNaughton (born 1953), footballer, football coach and PE teacher
 Nancy Riach (1927–1947), record holding and champion Scottish swimmer who died of polio at the age of 20
 Alan Fisher Former Brandon House Captain (1982–83) and now international TV journalist

References

External links
Official Website
War Memorial Trust

Buildings and structures in Motherwell
Secondary schools in North Lanarkshire
1898 establishments in Scotland